is a side-scrolling shoot 'em up video game released for the MSX computer in 1987 by Konami. The game is a sequel to Nemesis, the MSX version of Gradius, but is unrelated to the arcade game Gradius II (which used the Roman numeral 'II'). This version was ported to the X68000 computer under the name , with some graphical and aural enhancements.

In a departure from other games, instead of controlling Vic Viper, the available ship is called Metalion. Unlike other titles, this game has a heavier focus on story, which is told by cut-scenes. The gameplay is mostly unchanged from the rest of the series, though there are some powerups that temporally gives the ship some enhancements. Also, when the bosses are being defeated, if the Metalion flies where they are, a mini-level can be accessed in order to obtain new permanent upgrades, if the mini levels are successfully cleared.

Plot
The Director General of Space Science Agency Dr. Venom was exiled to Planet Sard for a failed coup d'état.  In the year 6665, he escapes and invades Planet Nemesis and the seven planets it controls with the help of Bacterion.  The Nemesis High Council sends James Burton, ex-pilot of the Vic Viper, to pilot Metalion and attack Dr. Venom and the Bacterion invaders.  The game takes place during the year 6666.

Nemesis '90 Kai
This X68000 port is essentially an enhanced remake of Nemesis 2 with graphical quality on par with Gradius III.
It includes two new stages exclusive to this version of the game, and four new bosses (two of which replace the rematches fought in the MSX version.)
Some people still prefer the original for its charm and color scheme.

Ports
Aside from being remade as Nemesis '90 Kai, Nemesis 2 was also ported to mobile phones in 2006 and Sony PSP in 2007 as part of the Salamander Portable collection.

Gradius 2 was re-released for Wii's Virtual Console in 2009, for Project EGG in 2015, and for Wii U Virtual Console in 2016 in Japan.

References

External links
Extensive Japanese page on Nemesis '90 Kai
Extensive Japanese page on Nemesis 2
Japanese page of Nemesis 2 covering the introduction

1987 video games
D4 Enterprise games
Gradius video games
Mobile games
MSX games
X68000 games
Virtual Console games
Windows games
Multiplayer and single-player video games
Video games developed in Japan
Video games scored by Kinuyo Yamashita